The unincorporated hamlet of Malden is a bedroom community along the historic  'Old National Pike' (1811) within borough of Centerville Washington County, Pennsylvania.  Malden was a historical wagon stop amidst farms during the early 19th century surge of westward migration to settle the Northwest Territory after 1790.

Today, as it has since the US-40 roadbed was flipped northerly to miss the road through West Brownsville, the hamlet sits in the apex of a westward pointing triangle formed by the intersection of the newer early 1960s four lane Highway improvement of U.S. Route 40 and the consequent by-pass of that stretch of old historic National Highway.  Thus both US-40 bridges across the Monongahela River, the Lane Bane Bridge and the Brownsville-West Brownsville Bridge connect their respective (Old/New) US-40 routes, merging just to the west side of the Malden commercial strip. Old US 40 turns left, travels past the lower Brownsville business district and several congestion causing traffic lights before turning right to cross the older Brownsville Bridge, zig through the southern part of West Brownsville and climb to Malden's east side.

Both Malden and the widespread rural Borough of Centerville, its technical parent community, share the 15417 postal zip code of the Brownsville, PA post-office across the Monongahela in Fayette County, now existing real estate momentum keeps them each alive, shrinking.  Just another one of several satellite communities built to support workers of area coal mines and Brownsville's once vibrant boat building, outfitting, and rust belt industries.

Settled initially about 1780-1800 as the surge of emigration westward across the Alleghenies was becoming first a steady stream, then a post-war deluge as the Northwest Territory was organized by the new (first) US Congress.  The area's relatively level geography atop the long climb along Nemacolin's Path and the National Road lent itself to emigrant's resting their draft animal teams and making camp, overnight or possibly to recuperate from the arduous mountain trek and the ascent from the traffic jams, congestion and general hustle & bustle of land limited Brownsville and West Brownsville.  Brownsville rapidly developed into a river boat building and outfitting center and the entire four county region spawned support industries from small foundries smelting local iron ores and producing iron goods and boat hardware, to glass and pottery kilns, charcoal and fire wood, lumberjacks and sawyers.

Accordingly, with a steady stream of people pushing westwards, one of the first structures erected was the Malden Inn, which also sat along the road junction with Malden Road, connecting the plateau with California, PA and other developing communities along the left bank Monongahela River.  The Inn is located at one side of the small business district and today houses a more modern cultural landmark, Paci's Restaurant, which has served the tri-county area with fine dining and receptions since the 1930s. Within another block, opposite Malden road lies another local multi-county landmark, Cuppies Drive-In Theatre which began operations in 1947 and was sold by the family in 1976 and renamed the Malden Drive-In Theater.

Since the 1970s decline in the rust belt industries, like the whole region, the neighborhood has become a relative backwater, but the commercial decline of Malden began in the early 1960s — despite the community being centrally convenient, desirable as a satellite & upscale housing community to several larger Mon-Valley towns — because the re-routed US-40 traffic now bypassed its small collection of commercial enterprises

This improvement project locally rerouted the path of US-40 away from the main street (Market Street) through the region's former gateway town, Brownsville – away from the Old National Road and the former path of U.S. Route 40. Including a two-mile lead-in stretch of Market Street in upper Brownsville – about three miles of US-40 in eastern Washington County, Pennsylvania, was rerouted across the Lane Bane Bridge to bypass the lower business district of downtown Brownsville about 1960–61 in an attempt to mitigate chronic traffic problems. The new highway oriented nearly due east-to-west cuts through the neighborhood north of most housing, and cutting Malden Road to California.  The New US40 resumes two lane operation and wyes with the Old National Road at the west end of the community.

The hamlet has an old tavern landmark and former inn situated at a Tee-road junction (Malden Road to California and Charleroi) known variously in history as 'John Kreps Tavern',  'The Kreppsville Inn') and most commonly today, the Malden Inn, a building on the National Register of Historic Places.

Geography
Malden is situated along a  relatively level strip of land; a stretch of Old U.S. Route 40 where the initial housing lots line the road. Two multi-street housing developments developed during the 1950s, one to either side of the highway. The development to the north is larger and has parallel streets trending up hill street to street. The south side development is a loop, older, and has a fraction of the houses, but over looks the Monongahela Valley unincorporated communities of Denbeau Heights (formerly Denbo Heights) and Denbo respectively, nearer to farther.

Parent community, Brownsville, Pennsylvania was the first possible (closest) place travelers crossing the Alleghenies could reach the waters of the Ohio River and Mississippi River drainage basins. Most river banks were too steep for wagons, and on the convex side of a sweeping curve, Brownsville had several tributary streams cutting across the cliff face formed by the River's cut bank, which served to erode parts forming a ramp-like descent to the river shores. The opposite shore (West Brownsville also had several climbable slopes and the two banks were connected by a passable ford just upstream of the Brownsville Bridges built in support of the National Road.

The wagon road was an emigrant trail, serving to convey settlers west to the new lands of the Northwest Territory and the Mississippi River basin. The Cumberland Pike began as a privately funded toll road, between Baltimore and Cumberland, Maryland, then gradually extended westwards as improvements could be made. The toll road never reached West of Brownsville, and the balance (eventually reaching Vandalia, Illinois) was built with Federal funds to support westward migration. The part from the Monongahela to the Ohio River crossing at Wheeling, West Virginia, in general, followed the path of the western leg of the long Amerindian trail known as Nemacolin's Path or 'Chief Nemacolin's Trail', as had the Cumberland Pike through the Mountains.

Notes

References
 Malden Place, Name: Malden Place ID: 1205066 Class: Populated Place County: Washington Pennsylvania Latitude: 40.0215N Longitude: 079.5550W Elevation:  USGS Map name: California
 Search summary

Populated places established in 1820
Pittsburgh metropolitan area

Unincorporated communities in Washington County, Pennsylvania
Unincorporated communities in Pennsylvania